Emily Justine Perkins  (born 1970 in Christchurch) is a New Zealand author.

Early life
Perkins was born in Christchurch. She graduated from Toi Whakaari with a Diploma in Acting in 1989. She also studied writing at Victoria University.

Career
Perkins first won attention in 1996 with her first collection of stories, Not Her Real Name and Other Stories.

Perkins' novels are Leave Before You Go (Picador, 1998), The New Girl (Picador, 2001), Novel About My Wife (Bloomsbury Publishing, 2008), and The Forrests (Bloomsbury Publishing, 2012).

A longtime resident of London, Perkins lived in Auckland where she was employed by both The University of Auckland as a creative writing tutor and AUT University as a lecturer. She now lives in Wellington, where she is a senior lecturer at the Victoria University of Wellington International Institute of Modern Letters.

Perkins presented a television series about books called The Good Word 2009–2012.

Awards
Not Her Real Name and Other Stories was shortlisted for the New Zealand Book Award and won the Best First Book (Fiction) Award. Subsequently, it also won the Geoffrey Faber Memorial Prize.

Novel About My Wife won the 2009 Montana Book Awards and the Believer Book Award.

The Forrests was tipped by the Hay Festival to win the 2012 Man Booker Prize, but failed to reach the long list.

Perkins was appointed a Member of the New Zealand Order of Merit in the 2017 Queen's Birthday Honours, for services to literature.

Publications
Perkins, Emily (1998). Leave Before You Go. Picador. .
Perkins, Emily (2002). The New Girl. Picador. .
Perkins, Emily (2008). Novel About My Wife. Bloomsbury Publishing .
Perkins, Emily (2012). The Forrests. Bloomsbury Publishing .

References

External links
Official website
New Zealand Book Council biography
2008 Interview at books site Pickle Me This
Interview with Emily Perkins on her first play Standing Room Only, Radio New Zealand National, 2015

1970 births
Academic staff of the Auckland University of Technology
Living people
Victoria University of Wellington alumni
New Zealand women novelists
New Zealand women short story writers
20th-century New Zealand novelists
21st-century New Zealand novelists
21st-century New Zealand women writers
Believer Book Award winners
20th-century New Zealand short story writers
21st-century New Zealand short story writers
Members of the New Zealand Order of Merit
20th-century New Zealand women writers
Toi Whakaari alumni